This is a list of South African television related events from 2009.

Events
10 May - Sasha-Lee Davis wins the fifth season of Idols South Africa. Four days later, Idols announced that there had been problems with the voteline, and some of the vote that were sent before the cut-off time were not counted.
12 November - 19-year-old deaf hip-hop dancer Darren Rajbal wins the first season of SA's Got Talent.

Debuts

Domestic
1 February - The Big Debate (e.tv) (2009–present)
7 April - Getroud met rugby (KykNet) (2009–present)
16 September - Superdance South Africa (e.tv) (2009–present)
1 October - SA's Got Talent (SABC2) (2009–present)
5 December - Bun&Bunee (SABC3) (2009–2011)

International
5 January -  The Likeaballs (e.tv)
8 February -  Secret Diary of a Call Girl (M-Net)
5 April -  Home Free (SABC3)
26 May -  United States of Tara (M-Net)
17 December -  Durham County (M-Net)
 The Pinky and Perky Show (M-Net)
 Postman Pat Special Delivery Service (M-Net)
/ The Mr. Men Show (M-Net)
 Frankenstein's Cat (M-Net)
// Pixel Pinkie (M-Net)
 The Good Wife (M-Net)
 Noddy in Toyland (M-Net)
/ House of Saddam (M-Net)
 3-2-1 Penguins! (SABC2)
 Rush (M-Net)

Changes of network affiliation

Television shows

1980s
Good Morning South Africa (1985–present)
Carte Blanche (1988–present)

1990s
Top Billing (1992–present)
Generations (1994–present)
Isidingo (1998–present)

2000s
Idols South Africa (2002–present)
Rhythm City (2007–present)

Ending this year

Births

Deaths

See also
2009 in South Africa